Vinicius Nelson de Souza Zanocelo (born 30 January 2001), known as Vinicius Zanocelo or just Zanocelo, is a Brazilian footballer who plays as a midfielder for Santos.

Club career

Ponte Preta
Born in Santo André, São Paulo, Zanocelo joined Ponte Preta's youth setup in July 2016, from Juventus-SP, after previously playing futsal for Corinthians, Remo and Portuguesa. On 23 February 2019, he renewed his contract until December 2021.

Zanocelo made his first team debut on 20 March 2019, coming on as a late substitute for Nathan Silva in a 0–1 Campeonato Paulista away loss against Palmeiras. He scored his first goal ten days later, netting a last-minute equalizer in a 2–2 away draw against Oeste.

Zanocelo only started to feature more regularly in the 2020 campaign, where he contributed with 15 league appearances.

Ferroviária
On 23 January 2021, Ponte Preta reached an agreement with Ferroviária for the transfer of Zanocelo, for a fee of R$ 2.3 million. He was announced at his new club on 3 February, after agreeing to a four-year contract.

Zanocelo immediately became a starter at his new club, contributing with one goal in 12 appearances in the 2021 Campeonato Paulista.

Santos

On 4 June 2021, Zanocelo moved to Santos on a two-year loan deal, with a buyout clause. He made his club – and Série A – debut thirteen days later, replacing Gabriel Pirani in a 0–1 away loss against Fluminense.

Zanocelo scored his first goal for Peixe on 23 February 2022, netting his team's second in a 3–0 away win over Salgueiro, for the year's Copa do Brasil.

On 21 November 2022, Ferroviária announced the permanent transfer of Zanocelo to Santos, after the latter club activated his buyout clause.

Career statistics

References

External links
SMG Brasil profile 

2001 births
Living people
People from Santo André, São Paulo
Brazilian footballers
Association football midfielders
Campeonato Brasileiro Série A players
Campeonato Brasileiro Série B players
Associação Atlética Ponte Preta players
Associação Ferroviária de Esportes players
Santos FC players
Brazil under-20 international footballers
Footballers from São Paulo (state)